Graphium thule is a species of butterfly in the family Papilionidae. It is found in New Guinea. The larva feeds on Aquifoliacene ilex.

Graphium thule is not common but not known to be threatened. It mimics the danaines Ideopsis juventa and Tirumala hamata. There is one subspecies felixi Joicey & Noakes, 1915 and three forms. It is an endemic species.

See also
Fauna of New Guinea

References

thule
Butterflies of Oceania
Lepidoptera of New Guinea
Butterflies described in 1865
Taxa named by Alfred Russel Wallace